"Shores of California" is the third single by The Dresden Dolls duo, taken from the second studio album Yes, Virginia....

The Boston Herald noted The brand new "Shores of California" displayed Palmer's knack for writing bona fide pop tunes with its infectious sing-along chorus and familiar melody.

Personnel
Amanda Palmer - piano, vocals, lyricist, composer, songwriter
Brian Viglione - drums, guitar

Lyrical references
The song's lyrics include the lines "that's the way Aristophanes and Homer / wrote 'the iliad' and 'lysistrata'." Despite the ordering of the lyrics, it was Aristophanes who wrote Lysistrata, and Homer who wrote The Iliad. The Dresden Dolls' official lyrics page notes this by adding to the line in the lyrics: "that's the way Aristophanes and Homer / wrote 'the iliad' and 'lysistrata' (not in that order...)".

Music video
The music video for this single parodies the video for David Lee Roth's version of "California Girls". It featured Amanda Palmer, Kelly, David J (an original member of the band Bauhaus), Margaret Cho, Jason Webley, as well as the Dresden Dolls's Dirty Business Brigade and other fans that had been encouraged to take part in a band newsletter that was released prior to production. The music video was directed by Andrew Bennett of Shoe String Concert Videos and produced by Frank Caridi. On the official video on YouTube, it is noted that Brian was not available on the day of filming, which explains his absence from the video.

Notes

External links
 Watch "Shores of California" on YouTube
 Watch "Shores of California": The Making of on YouTube
 Video Static's review
 The Dresden Dolls official site including lyrics and downloads

2006 songs
The Dresden Dolls songs
Songs written by Amanda Palmer
2007 singles
Roadrunner Records singles